Jerry Allen Jared (born August 2, 1938) is an American attorney and former Democratic Party politician. Jared graduated from the YMCA Law School (now the Nashville School of Law) in June 1966 and was admitted to the Tennessee bar later that year. He was a delegate to Tennessee's 1971 constitutional convention and, in 1978, he defeated independent Bill Baird Griffith to win his first of five terms in the Tennessee House of Representatives. From 1985 until his retirement from the state house in 1989, Jared was the chair of the body's Democratic caucus.

The only son of Clara Olene (née Gill; 1915–2011) and Luke Allen Jared (1915–1986), he married the former Sylvia Ena Fields on September 2, 1960. The couple went on to have two children: a son, Matthew, and a daughter, Jennifer.

In 2008, the Tennessee General Assembly passed and Governor Phil Bredesen signed into law a bill to name a portion of Tennessee State Route 111 in Putnam County "Jerry A. Jared Highway."

References

1938 births
Living people
Democratic Party members of the Tennessee House of Representatives
Nashville School of Law alumni
People from Cookeville, Tennessee
Tennessee lawyers
Tennessee Technological University alumni
20th-century American lawyers
20th-century American politicians
21st-century American lawyers